Patagorhynchus is a genus of prehistoric monotreme mammal from the Late Cretaceous Early Maastrichtian age of Santa Cruz province, Argentina. It is known from a single species: Patagorhynchus pascuali. The holotype, MPM-PV-23087, consists of a lower right molar attached to a fragment of dentary. It was collected in the Chorillo Formation of Rio Gallegos, Santa Cruz, Argentina in 2022 and is housed in the Museo Padre Molina.

Etymology 
The genus name comes from Patago, referring to Patagonia and Greek rhynchus, meaning nose. The species name pascuali honors Argentine paleomammalogist Rosendo Pascual.

Evolution 
Patagorynchus represents the oldest known monotreme species from South America. Previous analyses deduced that later species of monotremes from South America like Monotrematum must have represented later migrations to South America after monotremes evolved in Australia. However, the discover of Patagorhynchus in strata from before the breakup of Gondwana suggests that monotremes were widely dispersed in southern Gondwana (that is, Australia, South America, and Antarctica) before its breakup.

References 

Fossil taxa described in 2023
Prehistoric monotremes
Cretaceous mammals of South America
Prehistoric mammal genera
Cretaceous Argentina